The 6th Toronto International Film Festival (TIFF) took place in Toronto, Ontario, Canada between September 10 and September 19, 1981. The festival screened films from more than twenty different countries. Ticket to Heaven, a Canadian film, was selected as the opening film. Another Canadian film, Threshold, was chosen as the closing film. The People's Choice Award was awarded to Chariots of Fire, directed by Hugh Hudson; the film later won an Oscar for Best Picture.

The Canadian documentary Not a Love Story, about the pornography industry, was also featured at the festival. Initially it was banned by the Ontario Censor Board, but later they allowed a single screening of film during the festival. With all the media attention surrounding this decision, public interest in the film increased. However, the Censor Board refused to permit a second screening of the film.

Awards

Programme

Gala
Chariots of Fire — Hugh Hudson
Cutter's Way — Ivan Passer
Cutting It Short — Jiří Menzel
Heartaches — Donald Shebib 
Man of Iron — Andrzej Wajda
Montenegro — Dusan Makavejev
Neige — Jean-Henri Roger and Juliet Berto
Only When I Laugh — Glenn Jordan
Threshold — Richard Pearce
Ticket to Heaven — Ralph L. Thomas

Buried Treasures
An Actor's Revenge — Kon Ichikawa
An Affair to Remember — Leo McCarey
Bird of Paradise 
Glen or Glenda — Ed Wood
The Indian Tomb — Fritz Lang
Lumière d'été — Jean Grémillon
Mikey and Nicky — Elaine May
Some Call It Loving — James B. Harris
The Tiger of Eschnapur — Fritz Lang
Track of the Cat — William A. Wellman

Critic's Choice
L'Altra donna — Peter Del Monte
Angels of Iron — Thomas Brasch
 — Peter Fratzscher
Beads of One Rosary — Kazimierz Kutz
Céleste — Percy Adlon
Charlotte — Frans Weisz
Desperado City — Vadim Glowna
Diva — Jean-Jacques Beineix
In Search of Famine — Mrinal Sen
Jaguar — Lino Brocka
Killer of Sheep — Charles Burnett
 — Rolf Bührmann, Walter Bockmayer
 — Jeanine Meerapfel
The Mark of the Beast — Pieter Verhoeff
Pixote — Héctor Babenco
The Pretenders — Jos Stelling
Short Circuit — Patrick Grandperret
Squeeze — Richard Turner

Culture Under Pressure
A curated program of films about minority groups under cultural pressure from the majority.
Aziza — Abdellatif Ben Ammar
Babylon — Franco Rosso
Chuquiago — Antonio Eguino
Far from Home — Sohrab Shahid-Saless
Gaijin: Roads to Freedom — Tizuka Yamasaki
Hazal — Ali Özgentürk
Magic in the Sky — Peter Raymont
Palermo or Wolfsburg — Werner Schroeter
Take Your Ten Thousand Francs and Get Out — Mahmoud Zemmouri
Where Dollars Grow on Trees (Les voleurs de job) — Tahani Rached

Laughing Matters
A program of classic comedy or comedy-drama films from throughout cinematic history, 
10 — Blake Edwards
À Nous la Liberté — René Clair
The Americanization of Emily — Arthur Hiller
Annie Hall — Woody Allen
The Apartment — Billy Wilder
The Awful Truth — Leo McCarey
Baby Doll — Elia Kazan
The Baker's Wife — Marcel Pagnol
The Bed Sitting Room — Richard Lester
Boudu Saved from Drowning — Jean Renoir
Bringing Up Baby — Howard Hawks
The Chess Players — Satyajit Ray
Dr. Strangelove — Stanley Kubrick
Duck Soup — Leo McCarey
Fanfare — Bert Haanstra
The Fireman's Ball — Miloš Forman
Five Day Lover — Philippe de Broca
The General — Clyde Bruckman and Buster Keaton
The Gold Rush — Charlie Chaplin
Hail the Conquering Hero — Preston Sturges
Happiness — King Vidor
The Heartbreak Kid — Elaine May
Hellzapoppin' — H. C. Potter
Jonah Who Will Be 25 in the Year 2000 — Alain Tanner
Laurel and Hardy Shorts — various directors
Lolita — Stanley Kubrick
Lord Love a Duck — George Axelrod
M. Hulot's Holiday — Jacques Tati
Macunaíma — Joaquim Pedro de Andrade
Mickey One — Arthur Penn
Il minestrone — Sergio Citti
Modern Times — Charlie Chaplin
Nashville — Robert Altman
Nights of Cabiria — Federico Fellini
The Nutty Professor — Jerry Lewis
A Pacemaker and a Sidecar (L'Eau chaude, l'eau frette) — André Forcier
The Paleface — Norman Z. McLeod
Pat and Mike — George Cukor
Polyester — John Waters
A Report on the Party and the Guests — Jan Němec
Seduced and Abandoned — Pietro Germi
Shampoo — Hal Ashby
Shoot the Piano Player — François Truffaut
The Sheep Has Five Legs — Henri Verneuil
Simon of the Desert — Luis Buñuel
Taking Off — Miloš Forman
Twentieth Century — Howard Hawks
W.R.: Mysteries of the Organism — Dušan Makavejev
Whiskey Galore! — Alexander Mackendrick
Zazie dans le Métro — Louis Malle

Less Is More
Films from independent studios.

The Dark End of the Street — Jan Egleson
Day by Day (Les Grands enfants) — Paul Tana
A Flight of Rainbirds (Een vlucht regenwulpen) — Ate de Jong
The Grass Is Singing — Michael Raeburn
Jet Lag — Gonzalo Herralde
Looks and Smiles — Ken Loach
She Dances Alone — Robert Dornhelm
Street Music — Jenny Bowen
The Vulture — Yaky Yosha

Real to Reel
Documentary films.
Being Different — Harry Rasky
Blood Wedding — Carlos Saura
The Followers (Les Adeptes) — Gilles Blais
A Free Life
From Mao to Mozart: Isaac Stern in China — Murray Lerner
Image Before My Eyes — Joshua Waletzky
Mur Murs — Agnès Varda
P4W: Prison for Women — Holly Dale and Janis Cole
Soldier Girls — Nick Broomfield and Joan Churchill

Special Presentations
The Contract — Krzysztof Zanussi
The Crime of Cuenca — Pilar Miró
Fårö Document — Ingmar Bergman
Fool's Gold
Gamin
The Gardener
The Heiresses — Márta Mészáros
Imagine the Sound — Ron Mann
In Defense of People — Rafigh Pooya
Krieghoff — Kevin Sullivan
Malevil — Christian de Chalonge
Not a Love Story — Bonnie Sherr Klein
A Time to Rise — Anand Patwardhan

3-D
A late-night program of genre and cult films exhibited in 3D film format.
Bwana Devil — Arch Oboler
Dial M for Murder — Alfred Hitchcock
Flesh for Frankenstein — Paul Morrissey
Fort Ti — William Castle
House of Wax — Andre DeToth
Inferno — Dario Argento
Miss Sadie Thompson — Curtis Bernhardt
Phantom of the Rue Morgue — Roy Del Ruth

Yılmaz Güney
Retrospective of the films of Turkish director Yılmaz Güney.
Elegy (Agit)
The Enemy (Düşman)
The Father (Baba)
The Herd (Sürü)
Hope (Umut)

World of Animation
Several programs of animated short films, presented under the titles Best British Animation, NFB Animation, Independent Animation, Ottawa Festival I & II, Animation & Commercials, Cinémathèque québécoise I & II and Best of Animation. However, sources are not currently available to confirm the titles of individual short films aired within the programs.

References

External links
 Official site
 TIFF: A Reel History: 1976 - 2012
1981 Toronto International Film Festival at IMDb

1981
1981 film festivals
1981 in Toronto
1981 in Canadian cinema
September 1981 events in Canada